Eck or ECK may refer to: 

 Eck (brewery), a German brewery
 Eck en Wiel, a town in the Dutch province of Gelderland
 Eck Stadium, in Wichita, Kansas, United States
 Eckankar, a religion
 Temple of Eck
 Loch Eck, in Scotland
 Team ECK, a World Wrestling Federation heel stable
 Electoral Commission of Kenya
 Energo-Chromo-Kinese, an esoteric-oriented movement
 European College of Kosovo

People with the given name or nickname 
 Eck Curtis (1902–1978), American football coach
 Dennis Eckersley (born 1954), American baseball player
 Alex McLeish (born 1959), Scottish footballer
 Eck Robertson (1886–1975), American fiddle player

People with the surname 
 Armin Eck (born 1964), German football coach and player
 Barbara Eck (born 1968), Austrian judoka
 Diana L. Eck (born 1946), American theologian
 Don Eck (born 1961), American football coach
 Dorothy Eck (1924–2017), American politician
 Gary Eck, Australian comedian and actor
 Gerhard Eck (born 1960), German politician
 Heinz-Wilhelm Eck (1916–1945), German World War II U-boat commander
 Jay Eck (born 1950), American college basketball coach
 Jenny Eck (born 1979), American politician
 Johann Eck (1486–1543), 16th-century theologian
 Johnny Eck (1911–1991), American freak show performer
 Keith Eck (born 1955), American football player
 Stefan Eck (born 1956), German politician
 Ted Eck (born 1966), American soccer player
 Thomas Eck (1914–1988), American football player and coach
 Valentin Eck (–before 1556), Swiss writer
 Werner Eck (born 1939), German historian

See also 

 Van Eck (disambiguation)
 Ekk (disambiguation)
 ECC (disambiguation)
 EC (disambiguation)
 EK (disambiguation)
 EQ (disambiguation)